H. P. Mendoza (born 13 March 1977, San Francisco, California) is an American film director, screenwriter, actor, producer and musician. He is best known for his micro-budget work as screenwriter, composer and lyricist on Colma: The Musical (2006) which was placed in the Los Angeles Times Top 20 Best Asian American Films List, as well as his follow-up musical and directorial debut, Fruit Fly (2010).

After writing and directing the 2012 film I Am a Ghost, Mendoza was inducted into the 2012 Essential SF by San Francisco Film Society. In 2017, he was a resident of the San Francisco Filmhouse for his screenplay, Bitter Melon which was released by Gravitas Ventures and ABS-CBN.

Along with his feature films, Mendoza is also known for his music in films and albums, notably his first album, Everything is Pop, re-released for its 10th anniversary in 2014.

In 2022, Mendoza is preparing for a tour of his three-screen visual album, Attack, Decay, Release, as well as the festival run for his most recent directorial effort, The Secret Art of Human Flight.

Film

Television

Discography 
2004 - Everything is Pop
2006 - Nomad
2006 - Colma: The Musical (original motion picture soundtrack)
2009 - Fruit Fly (original motion picture soundtrack)
2009 - Elsewhere
2011 - Longhorns (original motion picture soundtrack)
2012 - I Am a Ghost (original motion picture soundtrack)
2012 - Yes, We're Open (original motion picture soundtrack)
2021 - Folx
2022 - Attack, Decay, Release

References

External links 
 
 Official website

1977 births
Living people
Film directors from San Francisco
Male actors from San Francisco
Screenwriters from California
American lyricists
American male singer-songwriters
American singer-songwriters
American novelty song performers
21st-century American singers
21st-century American male singers
American gay actors
American gay musicians
American gay writers
American LGBT screenwriters
LGBT film directors
American male actors of Filipino descent
American film directors of Filipino descent
American LGBT people of Asian descent
20th-century American LGBT people
21st-century LGBT people